Christopher Philip Yorke Murphy (born 20 April 1947) is a British politician.

Murphy was born in Plymouth, Devon. He was the unsuccessful Conservative Party candidate for Bethnal Green and Bow in both the February 1974 and October 1974 general elections.

At the 1979 general election he was elected Member of Parliament for Welwyn Hatfield, gaining the seat from Labour incumbent Helene Hayman. He served until the 1987 general election, when he stood down.

He stood for the United Kingdom Independence Party in Eastleigh at the 2005 general election, but was not elected.

References
Times Guide to the House of Commons, 1983

1947 births
Living people
Conservative Party (UK) MPs for English constituencies
UK MPs 1979–1983
UK MPs 1983–1987
People educated at Devonport High School for Boys
UK Independence Party parliamentary candidates